The 1901–02 Scottish Cup was the 29th season of Scotland's most prestigious football knockout competition. The Cup was won by Hibernian, who defeated Celtic 1–0 in the Final. This gave Hibs their second Scottish Cup, a tally they would not add to until 2016.  The Final was due to be played at Ibrox on 12 April, but the first Ibrox disaster happened a week earlier during the annual Scotland v England fixture. This meant that the Final was delayed by two weeks and moved to Celtic Park, even though Celtic were one of the finalists.

Calendar

First round

Replays

Second round

Quarter-finals

Replays

Semi-finals

Final

See also
1901–02 in Scottish football

References

External links
RSSSF: Scottish Cup 1901–02
Soccerbase: Scottish Cup results

1901-02
1901–02 domestic association football cups
Cup